KCEN-TV (channel 6) is a television station licensed to Temple, Texas, United States, serving Central Texas as an affiliate of NBC. Owned by Tegna Inc., the station maintains studios on North 3rd Street in downtown Temple, with a news bureau and sales office in Killeen; its transmitter is located along I-35 south of Eddy.

KAGS-LD (channel 23) in Bryan operates as a low-power semi-satellite of KCEN-TV, serving the Brazos Valley. As such, it simulcasts all network and syndicated programming as provided through KCEN-TV but airs separate local newscasts, commercial inserts and legal identifications, and has its own website. KCEN-TV serves the western half of the Waco–Temple–Bryan market while KAGS-LD serves the eastern portion. The two stations are counted as a single unit for ratings purposes. Although KAGS-LD maintains its own studios on South Texas Avenue in Bryan, master control and some internal operations are based at KCEN-TV's facilities.

History
KCEN-TV signed on the air for the first time on November 1, 1953, originally owned by Frank W. Mayborn, publisher of the Temple Daily Telegram and owner of KTEM radio (1400 AM) in Temple. Early on, Mayborn realized that Temple/Killeen and Waco were going to be a single television market (although, then now, they are separate radio markets). To signify that his new station would serve all of Central Texas, Mayborn decided on the call letters KCEN-TV (for "Central Texas"), rather than KTEM-TV (for Temple), after his radio station property. He also built his studio near Eddy, roughly halfway between Temple and Waco.

It was the first television station to serve the Waco–Temple–Killeen market, and the second television station in Central Texas, signing on one year after Austin's KTBC. The station originally carried programming from all four major networks at the time but was a primary NBC affiliate. KCEN lost the CBS affiliation to KWTX-TV on January 1, 1956. The DuMont Television Network ceased operations later that year, leaving KCEN with a primary NBC affiliation and a secondary affiliation with ABC. 

For many decades since the Waco–Temple–Killeen market's introduction to cable in 1965, it was sandwiched with stations from other markets, with Dallas–Fort Worth (channels 4, 5, 8, and 11) to the north, Houston (channels 2, 11, and 13) to the southeast, and Austin (channels 7, 24, and 42, later 36) to the south and southwest (as well as some cable providers in the southeast).

In 1981, KCEN's transmitter facilities were moved to a new  tower just to the east of the original tower, expanding its coverage area to almost —one of the largest television station broadcast radiuses in the nation. The station now provides at least secondary over-the-air coverage to 33 counties–from the southern fringes of the Dallas–Fort Worth metroplex to the northern fringes of the Austin market.

The station switched its primary affiliation to ABC in March 1984, while continuing to carry some NBC programs during off-hours. When KXXV signed on the air on March 22, 1985, that station became the new primary NBC affiliate. However, over time, channel 6 became one of several ABC affiliates nationwide that were disappointed with the network's weak programming offerings, particularly on Thursday nights, which were bogging down KCEN's otherwise successful lineup. Meanwhile, six months later in September, the NBC affiliation returned to KCEN, while KXXV picked up the ABC affiliation. KCEN was the first television station in Central Texas to provide closed captions in its programming in September 1989.

KCEN, the Temple Daily Telegram and the Killeen Daily Herald remained under the Mayborn family's ownership after Frank's death in 1987, with his third wife, Sue, taking over running the station. In January 2009, Frank Mayborn Enterprises, Inc. entered into an agreement to sell KCEN to Dallas-based London Broadcasting Company, with a purchase price of $26 million—a handsome return on Frank Mayborn's original investment in KTEM radio in 1936.

KCEN had operated a low-powered translator in the Brazos Valley on UHF channel 62 for many years. On January 20, 2003, this translator was upgraded to Class A status on UHF channel 23 under new calls, KMAY-LP. Like its low-powered predecessor, it was a straight simulcast of KCEN, only mentioned in legal IDs. KMAY switched to digital on June 12, 2009. On July 3, 2011, London Broadcasting announced that KMAY would be converted to a semi-satellite of KCEN for the Bryan–College Station market under the new callsign KAGS-LD, with local news programming and commercial advertisements from KCEN replaced with newscasts and commercials targeted to the Brazos Valley area. KAGS was relaunched as a locally focused station in October of that year. On September 26, 2011, Azteca América programming on digital subchannel 6.3 was replaced with programming from classic television network MeTV.

On May 14, 2014, the Gannett Company announced that it would acquire KCEN-TV and five other LBC stations for $215 million. Gannett's CEO Gracia Martore touted that the acquisition would give the company a presence in several fast-growing markets, and opportunities for local advertisers to leverage its digital marketing platform. The sale was completed on July 8, 2014. 13 months later, on June 29, 2015, the Gannett Company split in two, with one side specializing in print media and the other side specializing in broadcast and digital media. KCEN was retained by the latter company, named Tegna. However, KCEN retained its London Broadcasting-era website until September 2016.

In January 2016, KCEN announced it would vacate its longtime studios in Eddy and move to the former complex of First Baptist Church in downtown Temple. Station management explained that the fast-growth of Bell County contributed to their decision; general manager Gayle Kiger said that it was important for "the fastest-growing and largest county" in the channel 6 coverage area to have a station based there. She also said that KCEN would have likely had to move anyway, as there was not enough room to expand its Eddy facility. The move was completed in early 2017.

News operation
KCEN-TV presently broadcasts a total of 21½ hours of local newscasts each week (with 3½ hours each weekday and one hour each on Saturdays and Sundays). On February 1, 2010, KCEN became the first television station in the Waco–Temple–Killeen market to begin broadcasting its local newscasts in high definition.

On March 23, 2015, KCEN-TV debuted the Gannett group's graphical theme.

Technical information

Subchannels
The station's digital signal is multiplexed:

Analog-to-digital conversion
KCEN-TV shut down its analog signal, over VHF channel 6, on February 17, 2009, the original target date in which full-power television stations in the United States were to transition from analog to digital broadcasts under federal mandate (which was later pushed back to June 12, 2009). The station's digital signal remained on its pre-transition VHF channel 9.

Though most television stations typically map their PSIP virtual channels to that station's analog channel allocation pre-transition, digital television receivers displayed KCEN-TV's virtual channel following the transition as 9.1, instead of 6.1 with the station's on-air branding changing to "KCEN 9" in accordance. Through the use of PSIP, digital television receivers display the station's virtual channel as its former VHF analog channel 6 (its on-air branding was changed to simply "KCEN-HD" as well) on February 1, 2010.

References

External links

MeTV Central Texas website

NBC network affiliates
Antenna TV affiliates
Cozi TV affiliates
Ion Television affiliates
Twist (TV network) affiliates
Defy TV affiliates
Tegna Inc.
Television channels and stations established in 1953
CEN-TV
Spanish-language television stations in Texas
1953 establishments in Texas
Temple, Texas
Former Gannett subsidiaries